|}

The Ascot Silver Cup, currently known for sponsorship purposes as the Dave Dawes Silver Cup, is a Premier Handicap National Hunt race in Great Britain. It is a handicap steeplechase. It is run at Ascot Racecourse, over a distance of about 3 miles (2 miles 7 furlongs and 180 yards, or 4,791 metres) and during its running there 20 fences to be jumped. The race is scheduled to take place in December.

The race was first run in 1965 and was sponsored by Scaffolding Great Britain and known as the SGB Chase until 1992.  It was then known as the Betterware Cup between 1993 and 1998 inclusive.

The race has been known as the Silver Cup Handicap Chase with various sponsors since 1999, but now lacks the prestige of its earlier days. It was re-classified as a Premier Handicap in 2022 when Listed status was removed from handicap races.

Winners

See also 
 Horse racing in Great Britain
 List of British National Hunt races

References

Racing Post:

External links
 Race Recordings 

National Hunt chases
National Hunt races in Great Britain
Ascot Racecourse
Recurring sporting events established in 1965
1965 establishments in England